The 2019 Orlando Open was a professional tennis tournament played on hard courts. It was the first edition of the tournament which was part of the 2019 ATP Challenger Tour. It took place in Orlando, Florida, United States between 31 December 2018 and 6 January 2019.

Singles main-draw entrants

Seeds

Other entrants
The following players received wildcards into the singles main draw:
  Jared Hiltzik
  Michael Redlicki
  Sam Riffice
  Alex Rybakov
  Evan Song

The following players received entry into the singles main draw using their ITF World Tennis Ranking:
  Tom Jomby
  Fabien Reboul
  Jelle Sels
  João Souza

The following players received entry from the qualifying draw:
  João Menezes
  J. J. Wolf

The following player received entry as a lucky loser:
  Gijs Brouwer

Champions

Singles

 Marcos Giron def.  Darian King 6–4, 6–4.

Doubles

 Romain Arneodo /  Andrei Vasilevski def.  Gonçalo Oliveira /  Andrea Vavassori 7–6(7–2), 2–6, [15–13].

2019 ATP Challenger Tour
2019 in American tennis
January 2019 sports events in the United States